"Chemical Heart" is the first single from Grinspoon's third studio album, New Detention. The song was written as a tribute to Jessica Michalik, who was crushed to death at the Sydney Big Day Out in 2001 during the Limp Bizkit set. It reached No. 25 on the Australian Singles Chart on 31 March 2002. The song was used in the Network Ten series premiere promos for Law & Order: Criminal Intent.

Track listing
Australian CD single
 "Chemical Heart" – 4:40
 "Waiting for Take Off" – 2:51
 "Gettin' Shit" – 2:27
 "Chemical Heart" (acoustic mix) – 4:39

Charts

References

2002 singles
2002 songs
Grinspoon songs
Song recordings produced by Phil McKellar
Songs written by Pat Davern
Songs written by Phil Jamieson
Universal Records singles